Rodolfo Fontiveros Beltran (1948- 2017) was a Filipino prelate of the Catholic Church and a professed member of the Dominican Order, who became a bishop of San Fernando de La Union on 30 October 2012 until his death on 17 June 2017.. He had previously served as apostolic vicar of Bontoc-Lagawe from 2006 to 2012.

Biography

Beltran was born in Gattaran in Cagayan Province. He was ordained as a deacon of the Archdiocese of Tuguegarao in 1974 and ordained to the priesthood in 1976 by the First Metropolitan Archbishop of Tuguegarao,Teodulfo S. Domingo. On 18 March 2006, on the eve of the Feast of St. Joseph, he was appointed as Apostolic Vicar of Bontoc-Lagawe with the titular see of Buffada. He was consecrated by Diosdado A. Talamayan on 16 May 2006, and installed as the 4th vicar apostolic of Bontoc-Lagawe on 29 May 2006. Beltran was later appointed as Bishop of San Fernando de La Union on 30 October 2012. On 12 June 2015 he joined the Order of Preacher

Notes

1948 births
2017 deaths
21st-century Roman Catholic bishops in the Philippines
Dominican bishops